The Stage Deli, located on Seventh Avenue just two blocks from Carnegie Hall, was a well-known New York City delicatessen, patronized by numerous celebrities. It was first opened in 1937 by Russian immigrant Max Asnas. The deli was known for Broadway-themed dishes including the "Mamma Mia!" sandwich. It had other menu items named for the celebrities who have dined there, including Sarah Ferguson, Adam Sandler, Dolly Parton, Martin Short, and Ron Blomberg.

In addition to serving regular meals, Stage Deli held special events including the Matzoh Bowl to determine the best matzoh ball soup.

The Stage Deli had a longstanding rivalry with the nearby Carnegie Deli. At one point, the rivals quarreled over which had the best pastrami, with the Stage Deli pointing out that the Carnegie Deli's pastrami was made with water from New Jersey, and the Carnegie Deli responding that the Stage Deli's pastrami, while made with New York water, was bought from a vendor instead of home-made. Thus, New Yorkers could get the same pastrami from any deli supplied by the same vendor.

A 1950 comedy album, The corned-beef Confucius, featuring Asnas "with some of Broadway's greatest comedians", was recorded at the deli.

Yankees' teammates Mickey Mantle, Hank Bauer and Johnny Hopp shared an apartment above the deli in the early 1950s, and its baseball ties reach out of town to Pete Rose, who once complained of not having a sandwich in his honor.

The Stage Deli appeared in an episode of "Late Night with Conan O'Brien" in 2001. Conan visited to see the sandwich they named after him, which turned out to be a soup and small salad.

The Stage Deli appeared in an episode of the sitcom Caroline in the City called "Caroline and the Sandwich". In the episode, the deli renames a sandwich (previously named after Jo Anne Worley) to name it after the main character Caroline's cartoon strip, "Caroline in the City". This leads to a backlash against her. Jo Anne and Caroline stage a feud to maximise the publicity.

The Stage Deli closed on November 29, 2012.  The owners cited a downturn in business, coupled with rising rent as the reasons for the closing. The Stage Deli previously found in the Forum Shops of Caesars Palace in Las Vegas, Nevada closed in June 2008.

See also
 List of delicatessens

References

External links
Stage Deli official website

Defunct delicatessens
Defunct restaurants in New York City
Restaurants established in 1937
Restaurants disestablished in 2012
Delicatessens in the United States